Gardy's Millpond is a  reservoir located in a tranquil setting along the Westmoreland and Northumberland county line in Northeast Virginia.

The upstream portion of the impoundment is swampy and the shoreline is largely forested. Scenic and decorated with lily pads, Gardy's Millpond is a quiet spot to fish for black crappie, bluegill and redear sunfish, bream, chain pickerel, largemouth bass and yellow perch.

A new dam was built here soon after Hurricane Bob caused severe damage to the older structure in 1985. The place was subsequently stocked with fish and re-opened to public fishing in 1990.

References

Virginia Department of Game & Inland Fisheries

Protected areas of Northumberland County, Virginia
Protected areas of Westmoreland County, Virginia
Reservoirs in Virginia
Landforms of Northumberland County, Virginia
Landforms of Westmoreland County, Virginia